The Hundred of Coglin is a hundred within the County of Herbert, South Australia and proclaimed in 1878.

The main town of the hundred was Dawson, South Australia with Oodla Wirra, South Australia lying just outside of the hundred.

References

Coglin